Al-Qa'im is an Iraqi border town located nearly 400 km (248 mi) northwest of Baghdad near the Syrian border and situated along the Euphrates River, and located in the Al Anbar Governorate. It has a population of about 74,100 and it's the center of the Al-Qa'im District.

The river water at Al-Qa'im carries less salt and mineral, so that it takes significantly less water to sustainably produce crops here than farther downstream, where more gallons of water must be used to avoid salinity.

The Al-Qa'im border crossing connects Al-Qaim to close city Abu Kamal in Syria.

Pre-war history
In the early 20th century, there was a khan (caravanserai) and police station in Al-Qa'im, but no village. The khan was built in 1907 and was the residence of a local administrator. The surrounding area was inhabited by Bedouin Arabs from the Karablah and Jara'if tribes.

Al-Qa'im was reportedly the site of Iraq's refined uranium ore production from 1984 through 1990. The officially named "Chemical Fertilizer Complex" was originally built by Belgian contractors in January 1976, and by 1982 it was processing phosphate from the nearby Akashat mine. That year, Iraq decided to build a uranium extraction facility on the same site, and hired Belgian contractors Mebshem to build the structure, completed in 1984. Unused uranium from Al-Qa'im was stored in nearby Tuwaitha.

The production facility was completely destroyed during a 1991 US bombing campaign during the Gulf War.

Iraq War

In the Iraq War, Qa'im was a center of attacks by the Iraqi insurgency against US military personnel at the nearby military base of Camp Gannon. The U.S. military regarded Qa'im as the entry point for foreign fighters into Iraq and viewed it as a strategically important point.

It was reported by Newsweek in 2003 that American soldiers stationed in the border city entered Syria. During the 3rd Armored Cavalry Regiment's control, a photojournalist embedded to the unit documented the city's events, and his photos were used in Time and Newsweek. A more candid article titled "Iraq's a Wild West" appeared in the September 2003 issue of Maxim. In November 2003, the 3rd Cavalry conducted the highly successful and largely peaceful Operation Rifles Blitz. During the operation the city was sectioned into three portions and searched house-to-house over a two-week period. Large numbers of weapons and suspected insurgents were captured during the operation, but some ill will was earned during the operation since it prevented Ramadan celebrations from taking place that year.

In March 2004, the 3rd ACR conducted a turnover with the 3rd Battalion, 7th Marines (3/7) of the 1st Marine Division. 3/7 served in Al Qa'im from March until September 2004. Shortly after the turnover was complete, the enemy launched a sustained offensive throughout the country, attempting to take advantage of the relative inexperience of the new force. This would become a common tactic as the war continued, but caught many units by surprise that spring.

In Al Qa'im, the activity heated up during April 2004 until the day of the battalion's pivotal battle on April 17. Although reports of enemy casualties are always difficult to quantify, the Marines likely killed 80 insurgents in the town of Husaybah that day, including foreign fighters. Five Marines from 3/7 were also killed in the battle. Units from every company in the battalion were engaged in Husaybah before the day was over.

On April 7, 2005, Iraqi insurgents captured the city, forcing the local police and US-supported Iraqi Soldiers to abandon the city. U.S. Marines launched several offensives in order to root out the insurgents and retake the city. On May 8, 2005, Marines launched the week-long Operation Matador to flush insurgents out of Qa'im. They faced stiff resistance from both local Iraqi fighters and foreign fighters, but succeeded.

According to local residents, Qa'im remained largely under the control of the insurgents. Along with towns like Haditha, they imposed a Taliban-like law, in which Western music, clothing, and hairstyles were banned. In early September 2005, it was reported that a sign posted outside the town stated "Welcome to the Islamic Republic of Qa'im".

In 2006 Qa'im, like many cities in the Anbar province, was believed to still be under Al-Qaeda insurgent dominance. The primary economic activity of Qa'im was smuggling. Damage from previous battles has somewhat depressed the local economy.

Post-Iraq War

IS control

Qa'im was under the control of the Islamic State from August 2014 to November 2017. In November 2014, unconfirmed reports indicated IS caliph Abu Bakr al-Baghdadi was travelling there and a coalition airstrike left him critically injured.

On 7 December 2016, an Iraqi Air Force airstrike at the town left 100 people dead including ISIS militants and civilians. It also injured another 100 people. 

By November 2017, Al-Qa'im was one of the last towns still under the control of the Islamic State. In the 2017 Western Iraq campaign, the Iraqi government advanced south of the city and by the end of October had reached its outskirts. They entered Al-Qa'im on 3 November 2017, supported by the Norwegian Telemark battalion, Danish and American special forces units.

Control by Kata'ib Hezbollah
After the eviction of ISIL forces, the Iraqi-based and Iranian-backed militia Kata'ib Hezbollah (KH), a group under the Popular Mobilization Units (PMU), and which is closely linked to Iran's Islamic Revolutionary Guard Corps, has played an important military and security role on the Iraqi side of the border. This role has continued after the reopening of the border crossing on 30 September 2019.

On 25 August 2019 a PMF convoy was hit by two drones near Al-Qa'im killing six, including a senior commander. PMF blamed Israel for the attack.

The Al-Qa'im border crossing between Abu Kamal in Syria and Al Qa'im in Iraq was reopened on 30 September 2019, after eight years of closure due to Syrian Civil War and Iraqi Civil War.

On 29 December 2019, the United States bombed headquarters of Kata'ib Hezbollah. The airstrikes targeted three targets in Iraq and two in Syria of Kata'ib Hezbollah, and included weapons depots and command posts according to Reuters and a US military statement. The attack was in retaliation for the attack on the K-1 base two days earlier and other attacks on bases with US forces in Iraq. The earlier attack killed a US contractor and wounded four soldiers. Twenty-five KH militiamen were killed in the US airstrikes.

On 28 June 2021, U.S. airstrikes targeted Iran-backed armed Shi'a militias in Al-Qa'im, Iraq and Al-Bukamal, Syria, leaving at least four militiamen dead.

Climate
Al-Qa'im has a hot desert climate (Köppen climate classification BWh).

References

Populated places in Al Anbar Governorate
Populated places on the Euphrates River
District capitals of Iraq